In music, 41 equal temperament, abbreviated 41-TET, 41-EDO, or 41-ET, is the tempered scale derived by dividing the octave into 41 equally sized steps (equal frequency ratios). Each step represents a frequency ratio of 21/41, or 29.27 cents, an interval close in size to the septimal comma.  41-ET can be seen as a tuning of the schismatic, magic and miracle temperaments. It is the second smallest equal temperament, after 29-ET, whose perfect fifth is closer to just intonation than that of 12-ET.

History and use

Although 41-ET has not seen as wide use as other temperaments such as 19-ET or 31-ET , pianist and engineer Paul von Janko built a piano using this tuning, which is on display at the Gemeentemuseum in The Hague. 41-ET can also be seen as an octave-based approximation of the Bohlen–Pierce scale.

41-ET guitars have been built, notably by Yossi Tamim. The frets on such guitars are very tightly spaced. To make a more playable 41-ET guitar, an approach called "The Kite Tuning" omits every-other fret (in other words, 41 frets per two octaves or 20.5 frets per octave) while tuning adjacent strings to an odd number of steps of 41.  Thus, any two adjacent strings together contain all the pitch classes of the full 41-ET system. The Kite Guitar's main tuning uses 13 steps of 41-ET (which approximates a 5/4 ratio) between strings. With that tuning, all simple ratios of odd limit 9 or less are available at spans at most only 4 frets. 

41-ET is also a subset of 205-ET, for which the keyboard layout of the 
Tonal Plexus is designed.

Interval size

Here are the sizes of some common intervals (shaded rows mark relatively poor matches):

As the table above shows, the 41-ET both distinguishes between and closely matches all intervals involving the ratios in the harmonic series up to and including the 10th overtone.  This includes the distinction between the major tone and minor tone (thus 41-ET is not a meantone tuning).  These close fits make 41-ET a good approximation for 5-, 7- and 9-limit music.

41-ET also closely matches a number of other intervals involving higher harmonics.  It distinguishes between and closely matches all intervals involving up through the 12th overtones, with the exception of the greater undecimal neutral second (11:10). Although not as accurate, it can be considered a full 15-limit tuning as well.

Tempering
Intervals not tempered out by 41-ET include the diesis (128:125), septimal diesis (49:48), septimal sixth-tone (50:49), septimal comma (64:63), and the syntonic comma (81:80).

41-ET tempers out the 100:99 ratio, which is the difference between the greater undecimal neutral second and the minor tone, as well as the septimal kleisma (225:224), 1029:1024 (the difference between three intervals of 8:7 the interval 3:2), and the small diesis (3125:3072).

References 

Equal temperaments
Microtonality